Bismarck Airport may refer to:

 Bismarck Memorial Airport in Bismarck, Missouri, United States (FAA: H57)
 Bismarck Municipal Airport in Bismarck, North Dakota, United States (FAA: BIS)